Imaclava ima, common name Ima's turrid, is a species of sea snail, a marine gastropod mollusk in the family Drilliidae.

McLean (1971) considered this species to be a synonym of Imaclava unimaculata (G. B. Sowerby I, 1834)

Description
The shell grows to a length of 50 mm.

Distribution
This species occurs in the Pacific Ocean off Baja California, Mexico.

References

  Tucker, J.K. 2004 Catalog of recent and fossil turrids (Mollusca: Gastropoda). Zootaxa 682:1–1295

External links
 

ima
Gastropods described in 1944

pt:Imaclava pilsbryi
vi:Imaclava pilsbryi